The National Agricultural Policy Center (NAPC), was established in 2000 through the work of the Project GCP/SYR/006/ITA of the Food and Agriculture Organization (FAO) of the United Nations, funded by the Government of Italy, to be part of the Syrian Ministry of Agriculture and Agrarian Reform. The project is now in its third phase. It is a center of research and analysis in the field of agricultural policies in Syria, and therefore strives to provide policy analysis for relevant stakeholders and policymakers in the field.

History 

The FAO Project GCP/SYR/006/ITA started in April 1998, and sought to respond to the Government of Syria's initiative to move from a socially planned economy to a social market economy. After background work and training from the Project the NAPC was established in 2000 as part of the Project's first phase (April 1998 - October 2001). In the second phase (November 2001 - October 2004) of the Project extensive training was delivered to the now fully staffed NAPC, an organizational structure was developed and a mid-term work-plan established. In third phase (November 2004 - October 2007), the Project assisted in consolidating the work of the NAPC with a view to its future independence and sustainability.

Establishment Aims 
To meet the long as well as short-term needs of decision-makers for in-depth and rigorous analysis for policy options on issues of relevance. Including:
 undertaking policy analysis studies enabling the formulation of integrated, coherent and effective agricultural strategies and policies
 suggesting policy directives to help relieve and overcome agricultural problems and constraints
 preparing and publishing policy studies and reports to enable the integration of the agricultural sector within the economy
 conducting training courses with a view to helping in the capacity building in policy analysis and planning within the Syrian Ministry of Agriculture and Agrarian Reform and other related Ministries and Institutions.

NAPC Structure and Focus Areas 
The NAPC is divided into four different divisions, each with a specific mandate related to the subject of agricultural policy analysis in Syria. These divisions are as follows: Trade Policy (TPD), Agro-Food (AFD), Rural Development (RDD) and Information and Communications (InfoCom). The focus areas of each division can be given as follows:

Trade Policy
International Trade Agreements
Investment
Trade Policy
Agricultural Marketing
Competitiveness

Agro-Food
Comparative Advantage Studies
Supply and Demand
Food Policy
Food Standards

Rural Development
Gender
Poverty
Migration
Natural Resource Management
Sustainable Development
Nutrition and Food Security

Information and Communication
Syrian Agricultural Database
Event Organization
Publications
ICT in Agriculture
Library Services
ICT for Development

Publications 
The major publications of the NAPC are the two Periodical Reports that it produces. One of which, Syrian Agricultural Trade (SAT) is published annually, the other of which, The State of Food and Agriculture in Syria (SOFAS) is biannual. These are substantial studies which give a regular overview of the situation of agriculture and agricultural trade in Syria.

In addition to these publications the NAPC regularly produces Policy Studies, Working Papers, and Policy Notes on a wide range of different issues. Furthermore, the NAPC makes available the proceedings of various seminars and workshops. All of the publications are made available through the NAPC website.

Syrian Agricultural Database (SADB)
Is a fully disaggregated and detailed database for Syrian Agriculture based on FAOSTAT format. The database is fully browseable and searchable through the NAPC website and is made available to the general public. It includes data on areas such as trade, national economic data, census, inputs and outputs, production, natural resources, fertilizers, machinery. The SADB has been available since 2003 and is updated each year to reflect the most recent data available.

External links 
NAPC Homepage
Syrian Agricultural Database
Food and Agriculture Organization of the United Nations
Syrian Ministry of Agriculture and Agrarian Reform
Syrian Ministry of Irrigation

References 

Agricultural economics
Agrarian politics
Agriculture in Syria
Sustainable agriculture
Rural community development
Research institutes in Syria
Agricultural research institutes
2000 establishments in Syria